The 2S9 NONA is a self-propelled and air-droppable 120 mm mortar designed in the Soviet Union, which entered service in 1981. The 2S9 chassis is designated the S-120 and based on the aluminium hull of the BTR-D airborne multi-purpose tracked armoured personnel carrier. More generally, the 120 mm mortar is referred to as the Nona, with the 2S9 also known as the Nona-S. Although no figures have been released, it is estimated that well over 1,000 2S9 were built.

Description

The 2S9 Nona-S is an amphibious vehicle that can be propelled through the water by two rear water-jets. It is operated by a four-man crew comprising a commander, a driver/mechanic, a gunner, and a loader. The hull interior is separated into a command compartment, a fighting compartment and an engine compartment. A welded steel turret is located at the middle of the hull. The two-man turret has hatches for the gunner and loader respectively.

The 2S9 utilizes a 120mm 2A51 mortar with a 1.8-meter-long barrel. The weapon is actually a hybrid of a mortar and howitzer, being an unconventional design that lacks a direct NATO counterpart. It is a rifled, breech-loaded weapon capable of firing HE (high explosive), white phosphorus and smoke rounds, as well as laser-guided munitions like KM-8 Gran. It can engage in indirect and direct fire, as well as targeting armoured vehicles; its armour-piercing rounds can penetrate the equivalent of 600-650mm of steel plate at up to a kilometre.

Operational History 

They have been deployed by Russia during the 2022 Russian invasion of Ukraine. In July 2022 video on social media purported to show Ukrainian forces using M777 to destroy towed 2B16 Nona-K in Hoptivka on the border to Russia.  In August 2022 Ukraine's armed forces claimed to use four captured, Russian 2S9 against Russian forces. In November 2022 a 2S23-SVK Nona was photographed in Ukrainian service, it was reportedly captured from Russian forces in March and took months to refit.

Variants
Variants of the 120mm Nona mortar:
 2S23 Nona-SVK – A BTR-80 based version. The 2S23 uses a slightly modified version of the 2A51 mortar, designated the 2A60. Through 2005 285 have been produced.
 2B16 Nona-K – A towed version. Fitted with a muzzle brake.

Current operators

 : 18 2S9
 : 18 2B23 Nona-M1
 : 12 2S9
 : 9 2S9
: 446, (excluding 500 2S9 in store in an unknown condition) of them: 280 2S9 Nona-S, 42 2S23 Nona-SVK and 124 2B16 Nona-K
 - Quantity unknown 
 : 17 2S9
: 2 2B16 and 40 2S9. 2S9 and 2B16 versions have used by both sides during Russo-Ukrainian War
 : 54 2S9
 - 18  Nona SVK, ordered 2009, delivered 2011–2012. 13 in service .

External links

 Walkaround 2S9 Nona from Kremenchug

See also 
 2S31 Vena tracked 120mm mortar system (2A80)

References
 

Self-propelled artillery of Russia
Self-propelled artillery of the Soviet Union
120 mm artillery
Gun-mortars
Motovilikha Plants products
TsNIITochMash products
120mm mortars
Field artillery of the Cold War
Mortars of the Soviet Union
Military vehicles introduced in the 1980s